Massimo Carnevale (born 1967) is an Italian cartoonist and illustrator, most famous for creating covers for comic books.

Career 

Born in Rome, Massimo Carnevale started his career at Cioè and Tattilo in 1987, going on to join the artist team at Eura Editoriale.

He published his first cover for the weekly magazine Skorpio in 1990.

Carnevale created many of the covers for the Y: The Last Man series, published by DC Comics, under the label Vertigo.

References

External links 
 Biography at the Lambiek Comiclopedia

1967 births
Living people
Artists from Rome
Italian cartoonists